The following is a list of schools in Kolkata, in the capital city of West Bengal, in India.

A

 A. K. Ghosh Memorial School
 Abhinav Bharti High School
 Adamas International School
 Adarsh Hindi High School (Govt. Aided), Bhowanipore
 Adarsh Shiksha Niketan (Govt. Aided)
 Aditya Academy (Senior Secondary)
 Akra Shaktigarh Rabindra Vidyapith
 Akshar School
 Albany Hall Public School
 Alipore Girls' & Boys' High School (Joka)
 Alipore Girls' & Boys' High School (Mominpore)
 Al Hidayah International Islamic School
 Al-Kauthar Public School
 Amarasi Vidya Mandir (Govt. Aided), Cossipore
 Andhra Association School
 Andrew's High School
 Anglo Arabic Secondary School, M. G. Road
 Apeejay School
 Army Public School, Ballygunge
 Arya Vidya Mandir, Behala
 Ashok Hall Girls' Higher Secondary School
 Assembly of God Church School
 Auxilium Convent School
 Aurobindo Vidyapith, Chetla, Kolkata

B

 Baranagore Ramakrishna Mission Ashrama High School 
 BDM international
 Bagmari-Manicktala Government Sponsored Higher Secondary School
 Ballygunge Government High School
 The BSS School (Ballygunge Shiksha Sadan)
 Barachara P B High School
 Bankim Ghosh Memorial Girls High School
 Barisha Girls' High School
 Baruipur High School
 Bhavan's Gangabux Kanoria Vidyamandir
 The Bhawanipur Gujarati Education Society School
 Bidhannagar Government High School
 Bidhannagar Municipal School
 Binodini Girls' High School
 Birla Bharati School
 Bidya Bharati Girls' High School
 Birla High School for Boys
 Birla High School for Girls
 Birla Bharati School 
 Brahmo Balika Shikshalaya
 Beltala Girls' High School
 Bethune Collegiate School
 Bharatiya Vidya Bhavan
 Balika Siksha School
 Barisha High School
 Bidya Bharti Girls High School, New Alipore
 Better High School, Prince Gulam Md. Shah Road
 Bridge International School
 Bishop George Mission School, CIT Road, Beliaghata
 Bara Bari Sri Krishna High School
 Behala Aryya Vidyamandir High School
 Behala High School
 Behala Girls High School
 Behala Shikshayatan
 Bagh Bazar Multi Purpose Girls High School
 Bratachari Vidyasram
 Bodhi Bhavans Collegiate school
 Bidya bhaban High School
 Boral Swamiji Vidyapith High School (H.S)
 Bejoygarh Vidyapith (H.S)
 B. T. Road Government Sponsored H. S. School 
 Bodhicariya Senior Secondary School
 Barisha Purba Para High School
 Bholananda National Vidyalaya, Barrackpore

C

 Cathedral Mission High School
 The Calcutta Anglo Gujarati School
 Calcutta Boys' School
 Calcutta Day School
 Calcutta Girls High School
 Calcutta International School
 Carmel School
 Calcutta Public School, Kalikapur
 Children's Foundation School, Gopalpur, Budge Budge Road
 Christ Church Girls High School, Dum Dum
 Chowringhee High School, Chowringhee Lane
 Central Collegiate School (Boys`), Bidhan Sarani
 Central Model School, A J C Bose Road
 Collins Inst., Lenin Sarani
 Central Modern School
 Calcutta Airport English High School
 Chakra Beria High School (H.S)
 Chittaranjan Colony Hindu Vidyapith, Deshbandhu Nagar
 Children Academy WBBSE High School, ThakurPukur
 Calcutta Training Academy
 Chetla Boys' High School, Chetla, Kolkata
 Chetla Girls' High School, Chetla, Kolkata

D

 Delhi Public School (DPS), Joka
 Delhi Public School (DPS), Megacity
 Delhi Public School (DPS), Newtown
 Delhi Public School (DPS), North Kolkata
 Delhi Public School (DPS), Ruby Park
 De Paul School, Bansdroni
 Dar Al-Arqam International School
 De Paul School, Garia
 Dayanand Anglo-Vedic Public School
 Dum Dum Kishore Bharati High School
 Dum Dum K K Hindu Academy
 Don Bosco School, Park Circus
 Douglas Memorial Higher Secondary School, Barrackpore
 Dreamland School, Makhla
 Dolna Day School
 D.A.V Public School (DAV), Taratala
 Derozio Mission High School

E

 Elias Meyer Free School & TT, B.B. Ganguly Street

F

 Future Hope School
 Future Campus School, Sonarpur
 Frank Anthony Public School

G
 Government Sponsored multipurpose school for boys' Taki House, A.P.C. Bose Road
 G.D.Birla Centre For Education
 G.B.Memorial.Institution
 Gandhi Colony Madhyamik Vidyalaya Boy's (H.S.)
 Grace Ling Liang English School
 Gyan Bharati Vidyalaya
 Gems Akademia International School
 Gokhale Memorial Girls High School, Harish Mukherjee Road
 Gurukul Vidya Mandir, Joka
 G S S Girls School, Mudiali
 Garfa Dhirendra Nath Memorial Boys' High School
 Garfa Dhirendra Nath Memorial Girls' High School
 Garden High School

H

 Hare School
 Hindu Mahila Vidyalaya
 Hindu School
 Hirendra Leela Patranavis School
 Hartley's High School, Sarat Bose Road
 Holy Child Girls' High School
 Holy Child Institute Girls' Higher Secondary School
 Holy Christ School, Tobin Road
 Holy Palace Multipurpose Institute, Teghoria
 Haryana Vidya Mandir, Salt Lake.
 Harvard House High School
 Harinavi DVAS High School
 Heritage School
 Harrow Hall, Park Street

I

 I B Memorial Institute
 Indira Gandhi Memorial High School, Dum Dum
 International Public School, Jessore Road
 Indian Board of School Education, Howrah
 Indus Valley World School

J

 Jadavpur High School
 Jadavpur Vidyapith
 Jadavpur Sammilita Girls' High School
 Jadavpur Baghajatin High School
 Jadavpur N K Pal Adarsha Sikshayatan
 Jagadbandhu Institution
 Jagatpur Rukmini Vidyamandir
 Jaynagar Institution
 Jaynagar Institution for Girls
 Jodhpur Park Boys High School
 Jodhpur Park Girls' High School
 Julien Day School
 Jibreel International School
 Jewish Girls School, Park Street
 Jyotinagar Bidyashree Niketan, Baranagar

K

 Kamala Chatterjee School
 Kamala Girls' High School
 Kalikrishna Girls' High School
 Katju Nagar Swarnamayee Vidyapith
 Kendriya Vidyalaya Command Hsopital, Alipore
 Kendriya Vidyalaya No.2, Salt Lake
 Krishnapur Adarsha Vidyamandir, Dum Dum Park
 Kendriya Vidyalaya Ballygunge, Ballygunge Maidan Camp
 Kidderpore Muslim High School
 Khalsa Model Senior Secondary School, Dunlop Bridge
 Kishore Vidyapith, 27B/3A, Chaulpatty Road, Kol-10
 Kidderpore Academy, Ram Kamal Street
 Kalidhan Institution, Southern Avenue
 Kumar Ashutosh Institution For Main Boys, Dum Dum 
 Kailash Vidyamandir, Chetla, Kolkata

L

 Loyola High School (Kolkata)
 Lajpat Hindi High School
 La Martiniere Calcutta
 La Maternelle Primary & High School
 Laban Hrad Vidyapith, Salt Lake
 Loreto Day School- Bowbazar
 Loreto Day School-Dharmatalla
 Loreto Day School- Sealdah
 Loreto Day School-Elliot Road
 Loreto House
 Lake Town Govt. Spons. Girls School
 Lakshmipat Singhania Academy
 Ling Liang High School, BB Ganguly Street
 Little Star High School
 Little Star (Primary School), Bansdroni
 Lycee School, Hindustan Road, Gariahat
 Lajpat Institution (Khidderpore, Babubazar)
 Lake View High School (Boys)
 Lake View High School (Girls)
 Lawrence Day School
 Loreto Convent Entally
 Lenin Prathamik Vidyalaya (Govt. aided)

M

 M.L Jubilee Institution (surya sen street)
 M. P. Birla Foundation Higher Secondary School
 Mahadevi Birla World Academy
 Mahakali Girls' High School
 Mahamayapur Adarsha Vidyapith
 Maharishi Vidya Mandir
 Maheshwari Girls' School
 Majilpur Atul Krishna Vinodini Bhattacharya Vidyapith
 Majilpur J. M. Training School
 Majilpur Shyamsundar Balika Vidyalaya
 Mangalam Vidya Niketan
 Mansur Habibullah Memorial (South End) School
 Md Jan Higher Secondary School
 Mitra Institution (Main)
 Modern High School for Girls
 Miranda House, Jorasanko
 Meghmala Roy Education Centre
 Multipurpose Govt. Girls' School, Alipore
 Modern English School, Burman Street.(Nursery & Primary)
 Momin High School
 Mount Litera Zee School
 MSB Educational Institute
 Morning Bells Academy High School

N 

 Narkeldanga High School
 National Model High School, Birati
 National English School
 National High School
 National Open School, Alipore
 Narmada High School
 Nivedita School for Girls, Bagbazar
 Nivedita Vidyapith, Barrackpore
 Narendrapur Ramakrishna Mission
 New Horizon High School Hazra
 Newtown School
 Nava Nalanda High School
 Narmada School
 Naktala High School
 New Alipore Multipurpose School 
 North Point Senior Secondary Boarding School, Arjunpur & Rajarhat Branch

O

 Oaktree International School (IB)
 Oriental Seminary
 Our Lady Queen of the Missions School
 Orient Day School (ICSE)

P

 Patha Bhavan
 P.A.J’s English Day School
 Patulia High School
 Pratt Memorial School
 Prarambh Pre-Primary School
 Pansila Deshbandhunagar Vidyamandir
 Purwanchal Vidyamandir
 Purushottam Bhagchandka Academic School
Pramila Memorial Advanced School (Formerly Known as "Pramila Memorial Institute")
Park English School

R

 Ruby Park Public School (Taratala)
 Rabindra International School (Subhasgram)
 Rahara Ramakrishna Mission (Khardah) 
 Ramakrishna Sarada Mission Sister Nivedita Girls' School
 Ram Mohan Mission High School (Lake Gardens)
 Rajabazar Boys & Girls' School (Rajabazar)
 Ram Chandra High School (Dhakuria)
 Rajasthan Vidya Mandir
 Ramesh Mitra Girls School
 Ravindra Bharathi Global School Newtown
 Riverdale high School

S

 St. Mary's Convent School, Santragachi.
 St. Anthony's High School
 South Point School and South Point High School
 Sailendra Sircar Vidyalaya, Shyam Pukur Street
 Saifee Golden Jubilee English Public School 
 Surah Kanya Vidyalaya
 South Academy High School
 Sodepur Chandrachur Vidyapith For Boys
 Sodepur Chandrachur Vidyapith For Girls
 Sinthi R. B. T. Vidyapith
 South City International School
 Sudhir Memorial Institute Madhyamgram
 Sakhawat Memorial Govt. Girls High School
 Scottish Church Collegiate School
 Sarangabad High School
 Shree Jain Vidyalaya
 Shree Maheshwari Vidyalaya
 Silver Point School
 St.Aloysius Orphanage & Day School Howrah
 St. Anthony's High School, Kolkata
 St Augustine's Day School
 St. Francis Xavier School
 Sir Nripendra Nath Institution
 St. George's Day High School, Collin lane
 St. James' School (India)
 St. John's Diocesan Girls' Higher Secondary School
 St. John's High School, Lakegardens, Tollygunge.
 St. Joan's School, Saltlake
 St. Joseph's College, Calcutta
 St. Jude's High School, Madhyamgram
 St. Lawrence High School
St. Mary's Orphanage & Day School, Kolkata
 St. Mary's School, Ripon Street
 St. Mary's & Jesus School, Bangur Avenue.
 St. Paul's Mission School
 St Thomas School, Kolkata
 Sahapur Harendranath Vidyapith
 St. Xavier's Collegiate School
 St. Xavier's Institution (Panihati)
 St. Pauls' School
 St. Teresa's Secondary School
 St. Sebastians School, Seal Lane
 Salt Lake Point School
 Salt Lake School
 Salt Lake Shiksha Niketan
 Sanskrit Collegiate School, College Street
 South End High School
 South Point School
 Sodepur High School
 Sree Sarada Ashram Balika Vidyalaya
 Shri Shikshayatan School
 Shree Dee Do Maheswari School
 St.Mary's School, Ripon Street
 St. Joseph & Marys School, New Alipore
 
 Harrow Hall, Karnani Mansion, Park Street
 St. Stephens School, Dum Dum
 Saifee Hall Golden Jubilee Public School, Park Lane 
 Seventh Day Adventist Day School, Park Street
 Sri Aurobindo Institute of Education, Salt Lake
 Sri Aurobindo Bal Mandir, New Alipur
 Sri Ram Narayan Singh Memorial High School, Simla Street&Kasba
 Sunrise (Eng.Med) School, Howrah
 South Suburban School Main, Bhowanipur
 Shree Ramkrishna Paramhans Vidhyapith High School, Garia
 Sri Sri Academy, Alipore
 South Point School & South Point High School, Kolkata

T

 Tirthapati Institution
 The Aryans School
 The Cambridge School (Calcutta New School Society)
 The Crescent School, Kolkata
 The Frank Anthony Public School
 The Future Foundation School, Kolkata
 The Heritage School,(IB)
 Techno India Group Public School
 The Good Shepherd Mission School, Barisha
 Tantia High School
 The Park English School
 The Modern Academy
 Tiljala Brajanath Vidyapith
 The hamilton high school, Tamluk
 The Newtown School, New Town
 Titagarh Andhra Vidyalayam
 The Future Foundation School, Tollygunge
 Titagarh Krishna Nath Municipal High School (H.S.), Talpukur, Barrackpore.
 Tiljala High School (H.S), Tiljala

U

 United Missionary Girls' High School
 Union Chapel School

V

 Vidya Bharati Global School, Dum Dum
 Vivekananda Mission
 Vidya Niketan, Bansdroni
 Vidyanjali International School, Cambridge International Centre

W

 WWA Cossipore English School
 Welland Gouldsmith School

Former schools
 Calcutta Japanese School (カルカタ日本人学校) (Nihonjin Gakko Japanese Day School)
 Calcutta Hoshu Jugyo Ko (Supplementary Weekend Japanese School)

References 

Complete list of schools in kolkata

Kolkata
 
Schools
Schools in Kolkata